Chipman's Mill was located near Laurel, Delaware, and is now the name of a Delaware State Park which encompasses the mill pond, including a boat ramp for fishing (now the primary activity). Chipman's Mill functioned into the late 1940s. Arson destroyed the structures in November 1986.

The relatively remote area had been one of the last remaining residences of the Lenni Lenape, who left Delaware and the Chipman's Pond area in 1748. Settlers soon came, attracted by the available timber and water power. Christ Church was built nearby, which still survives.

The destroyed mill had two structures. In 1884, Joseph Chipman had built a one-story mill over the millrace (which survives), which contained turbines and millstones. The wooden superstructure featured mortise and tenon joinery. An adjoining two story section was moved to the site from elsewhere.

See also
 Chipman Potato House, also built by the Chipman family nearby
 Old Christ Church (Laurel, Delaware), on the other side of the mill's dam

References

Grinding mills in Delaware
Grinding mills on the National Register of Historic Places in Delaware
Buildings and structures in Sussex County, Delaware
Industrial buildings completed in 1884
Laurel, Delaware
National Register of Historic Places in Sussex County, Delaware
Buildings and structures in the United States destroyed by arson
1884 establishments in Delaware